Emmanuel Oti Essigba (born 24 September 1996) is a Ghanaian professional footballer who plays as a winger for Malaysia Super League club Melaka United.

International career
He represented the national under-17 team at the 2013 African U-17 Championship (and its qualifiers).

References

External links
 
 

Ghanaian footballers
Ghanaian expatriate footballers
1996 births
Living people
Danish Superliga players
Liga Portugal 2 players
Liga 1 (Indonesia) players
J1 League players
Malaysia Super League players
S.C. Braga B players
Esbjerg fB players
Madura United F.C. players
F.C. Vizela players
Vegalta Sendai players
Melaka United F.C. players
Association football wingers
Ghanaian expatriate sportspeople in Portugal
Expatriate footballers in Portugal
Ghanaian expatriate sportspeople in Denmark
Expatriate men's footballers in Denmark
Ghanaian expatriate sportspeople in Japan
Expatriate footballers in Japan
Ghanaian expatriate sportspeople in Indonesia
Expatriate footballers in Indonesia
Ghanaian expatriate sportspeople in Malaysia
Expatriate footballers in Malaysia
Ghana youth international footballers
People from Eastern Region (Ghana)